Film-makers and others have made many adaptations of The Jungle Book, an 1894 collection of stories written by Rudyard Kipling, inspired by his life in India.

Books 

 Harvey Kurtzman's Jungle Book, a 1959 graphic novel
 The Third Jungle Book, a 1992 pastiche story collection by Pamela Jekel

Feature films

Mowgli stories
Theatrical films
 The Jungle Book (1942 film), a live-action film adaptation by United Artists
 The Jungle Book (1967 film), animated film adaption by Disney
 The Jungle Book 2 (2003), a sequel to Disney's 1967 film
 The Jungle Book (1994 film), Disney's first live action remake of the 1967 animated film.
 The Second Jungle Book: Mowgli & Baloo (1997), live action film adaptation by TriStar Pictures
 The Jungle Book (2016 film), Disney's third live action remake of the 1967 animated film.
 Mowgli: Legend of the Jungle (2018), a Netflix/Warner Bros. film directed by Andy Serkis

Direct-to-video films
 Adventures of Mowgli, five Soviet animated film adaptations, originally released between 1967 and 1971
 Jungle Book (1990), animated film from Golden Films
 The Jungle Book (1992), animated film from Bevanfield Films
 Jungle Book (1995), animated film from Jetlag Productions
 The Jungle Book: Mowgli's Story (1998), Disney's second live action remake of the 1967 animated film, in which many of the plot elements are changed.

Other stories
 Elephant Boy (1937), based on the story "Toomai of the Elephants"
 Rikki-Tikki-Tavi (1975), based on the story of the same name

Television

Mowgli stories
 Mowgli's Brothers (1976), a made for TV animated film based on story of same name by Chuck Jones
 Jungle Book Shōnen Mowgli (1989–90), a 1989 Japanese anime series, later dubbed into several languages
 TaleSpin is a spin-off of the 1967 animated film.
 Jungle Cubs is another spinoff of the 1967 animated film.
 Mowgli: The New Adventures of the Jungle Book, a 1998 live-action TV series
 The Jungle Book (2010 TV series), a 2010 CGI TV series

Other stories
 The White Seal (1975), an animated television film based on the story of the same name by Chuck Jones
 Rikki-Tikki-Tavi (1975), an animated television film based on the story of the same name by Chuck Jones

Other 
 The Jungle Book (Disney franchise)
 The Jungle Book (soundtrack), from the 1967 film
 The Jungle Book (video game), a 1994 adaptation of the 1967 film
 The Jungle Book Groove Party, a 2000 dance video game
 The Jungle Book: Alive with Magic, a 2016 amusement ride
 The Jungle Book, an EP by That Handsome Devil, consisting of covers of songs from the 1967 film.
 A dzsungel k%C3%B6nyve (1996), a Hungarian musical based on The Jungle Book.

See also
 The Second Jungle Book, an 1895 collection of Kipling stories based on the same theme sequel to the original.

Jungle Book, The